Frank Adams (1930–1989) was a British mathematician.

Frank Adams may also refer to:
Frank Dawson Adams (1859–1942), Canadian geologist 
Frank Reginald Adams (1853–1932), rugby union international
Frank Adams (Florida politician), state senator
Frank Adams (artist) (1914–1987), American artist
Frank Adams (Canadian football) (born 1970), Canadian football cornerback
Frank Adams (footballer) (1933–2009), goalkeeper
Bluey Adams (Frank Adams, 1935–2019), Australian rules footballer
Frank R. Adams (1883–1963), American author, screenwriter, composer, and newspaper reporter
Yank Adams (Frank B. Adams, 1847–1923), finger billiardist

See also
Francis Adams (disambiguation)
Frank Adam (born 1968), Flemish author
Frank Forbes Adam (1846–1926), British banker
Franklin Adams (disambiguation)
Adams (surname)